is a Japanese swimmer who competed at the 1932 Summer Olympics. She finished fifth in the 4×100 metre freestyle relay and was eliminated in the first round of the 100 m backstroke event.

References

External links

1917 births
Possibly living people
Japanese female backstroke swimmers
Japanese female freestyle swimmers
Olympic swimmers of Japan
Swimmers at the 1932 Summer Olympics
20th-century Japanese women